The 1925 Washington University Pikers football team was an American football team that represented Washington University in St. Louis as a member of the Missouri Valley Conference during the 1925 college football season. In its first season under head coach Bob Higgins, the team compiled a 2–5–1 record and was outscored by a total of 95 to 29. The team played its home games at Francis Field in St. Louis.

Schedule

References

Washington University
Washington University Bears football seasons
Washington University Pikers football